This is a list of axioms as that term is understood in mathematics, by Wikipedia page.  In epistemology, the word axiom is understood differently; see axiom and self-evidence. Individual axioms are almost always part of a larger axiomatic system.

ZF (the Zermelo–Fraenkel axioms without the axiom of choice)
Together with the axiom of choice (see below), these are the de facto standard axioms for contemporary mathematics or set theory. They can be easily adapted to analogous theories, such as mereology.

 Axiom of extensionality
 Axiom of empty set
 Axiom of pairing
 Axiom of union
 Axiom of infinity
 Axiom schema of replacement
 Axiom of power set
 Axiom of regularity
 Axiom schema of specification

See also Zermelo set theory.

Axiom of choice
With the Zermelo–Fraenkel axioms above, this makes up the system ZFC in which most mathematics is potentially formalisable.

Equivalents of AC
Hausdorff maximality theorem
Well-ordering theorem
Zorn's lemma

Stronger than AC
Axiom of global choice

Weaker than AC
Axiom of countable choice
Axiom of dependent choice
Boolean prime ideal theorem
Axiom of uniformization

Alternates incompatible with AC
Axiom of real determinacy

Other axioms of mathematical logic

Von Neumann–Bernays–Gödel axioms
Continuum hypothesis and its generalization
Freiling's axiom of symmetry
Axiom of determinacy
Axiom of projective determinacy
Martin's axiom
Axiom of constructibility
Rank-into-rank
Kripke–Platek axioms
Diamond principle

Geometry

Parallel postulate
Birkhoff's axioms (4 axioms)
Hilbert's axioms (20 axioms)
Tarski's axioms (10 axioms and 1 schema)

Other axioms

Axiom of Archimedes (real number)
Axiom of countability (topology)
Dirac–von Neumann axioms
Fundamental axiom of analysis (real analysis)
Gluing axiom (sheaf theory)
Haag–Kastler axioms (quantum field theory)
Huzita's axioms (origami)
Kuratowski closure axioms (topology)
Peano's axioms (natural numbers)
Probability axioms
Separation axiom (topology)
Wightman axioms (quantum field theory)
Action axiom (praxeology)

Axioms

See also
 Axiomatic quantum field theory
 Minimal axioms for Boolean algebra